Robin Juel Skivild (born 21 August 2001) is a Danish road and track cyclist, who currently rides for UCI Continental team .

Major results

Road
2018
 4th Overall SPIE Internationale Juniorendriedaagse
1st  Mountains classification
1st  Young rider classification
 7th Johan Museeuw Classic
2019
 1st  Mountains classification, SPIE Internationale Juniorendriedaagse
 8th Overall Saarland Trofeo
2021
 1st  Mountains classification, Tour Poitou-Charentes en Nouvelle-Aquitaine
2022
 1st  Mountains classification, Giro della Valle d'Aosta
 10th Sundvolden GP

Track
2018
 3rd  Points race, UCI Junior World Track Championships
2022
 2nd  Team pursuit, UEC European Track Championships

References

External links
 

2001 births
Living people
Danish track cyclists
Danish male cyclists
21st-century Danish people